Encarsia hansoni is a species of hymenoptera in the family Aphelinidae. The scientific name was first validly published in 1998 by Evans & Polaszek.

The species' habitat is Costa Rica. No subspecies are listed in the Catalog of Life.

References 

Insects described in 1998
Aphelinidae